Josefina Fernández (born 17 August 1991) is an Argentina volleyball player who participated with the Argentina national team at the Pan-American Volleyball Cup (in 2012, 2013, 2014, 2015, 2016), the FIVB Volleyball World Grand Prix (in 2012, 2013, 2014, 2015, 2016), the 2014 FIVB Volleyball Women's World Championship in Italy, 2018 FIVB Volleyball Women's World Championship, the 2015 FIVB Volleyball Women's World Cup in Japan, the 2015 Pan American Games in Canada, and the 2016 Summer Olympics in Brazil.

At club level, she played for Club de Regatas Santa Fe, Cecell  Lleida, Gimnasia y Esgrima La Plata, CS Volei Alba Blaj Gimnasia y Esgrima La Plata and Franches-Montagnes before moving to Fatum-Nyíregyháza in August 2016.

Clubs
  Club de Regatas Santa Fe (2005–2008)
  Cecell Lleida (2008–2009)
  Gimnasia y Esgrima (LP) (2009–2012)
  CS Volei Alba-Blaj (2013–2013)
  Gimnasia y Esgrima (LP) (2013–2014)
  Franches-Montagnes (2014–2016)
  Fatum-Nyíregyháza (2016–present)

References

External links
 Profile at CEV

1991 births
Living people
Argentine women's volleyball players
Sportspeople from Santa Fe, Argentina
Pan American Games competitors for Argentina
Volleyball players at the 2015 Pan American Games
Olympic volleyball players of Argentina
Volleyball players at the 2016 Summer Olympics
Outside hitters
Expatriate volleyball players in Spain
Expatriate volleyball players in Romania
Expatriate volleyball players in Switzerland
Expatriate volleyball players in Hungary
Argentine expatriate sportspeople in Spain
Argentine expatriate sportspeople in Romania
Argentine expatriate sportspeople in Switzerland
Argentine expatriate sportspeople in Hungary
21st-century Argentine women